Girija Kalyanam (Telugu: గిరిజా కళ్యాణం) was an Indian Telugu language Soap opera directed by Ravi Nagapuri aired on Gemini TV from 20 January 2020 to 10 April 2021 every Monday to Saturday at 9:30PM IST for 284 episodes. The show starred Suhasini, Dharma and Akku Aakarsh in leading roles.

Synopsis
Girija, a pure hearted village girl gets deserted by her money-minded husband Akash. But circumstances force her into Kalyan’s house as his dead wife Varna, due to their uncanny resemblance. While Girija revives the lost glory of Kalyan’s business, she becomes a murder target for his enemy Indrani. Watch Girija win the battles of life in this intense emotional drama.

Cast
Suhasini as Girija Devi and Varna (dual role)
Dharma as Kalyan (Varna's husband)
Akku Aakarsh as Akash (Girija's husband)
Purvi Joshi as Aishwarya, (Akash's fiance)
Baby Nanditha as Loukya (Kalyan and Varna's daughter)
Raasi as Jhansi, Police officer
G.V Narayana Rao as Raghavaiah (Girija's and Varna's father)
Usha Rani as Chaya devi, Kalyan's Aunt
Sravani as Indrani (Nethra's mother)
Ritu Chowdary as Nethra (Kalyan's sister in law)
Nata Kumari as Neelaveni (Akash's mother)
Srinivasa Rao Dandapani (Akash's father)
Reena as Stellamma
J L Srinivas as Viswanadh (Kalyan's father)
Marakala Srinu as Srinu
Jabardast Bobby as Ravi
Goparaju Ramana as Lakshmi Narayana (Varna's father)
Manasa as Vidya

References

External links 
 

Indian television soap operas
Telugu-language television shows
2020 Indian television series debuts
Gemini TV original programming